Mahmoud al-Rimawy (Arabic: محمود الريماوي) (born 1948) is a Palestinian journalist and author.

Life

Al-Rimawy was born in Bayt Rima in the West Bank. He has worked as a journalist for more than 40 years in many different parts of the Middle East, including Beirut, Cairo and Kuwait. He is currently based in Amman, where he is editor-in-chief of the Jordanian newspaper Al Rai.

Al-Rimawy published his debut collection of short stories in 1972. Since then he has published other collections, including a volume of selected short stories entitled Missed Appointment (Amman, 2002). His work has been translated into English and French, and has featured in Banipal magazine. His recent novel Who Will Cheer up the Lady? was longlisted for the 2010 Arabic Booker Prize.

References

1948 births
Palestinian novelists
Palestinian journalists
Palestinian short story writers
Living people

People from Bani Zeid al-Gharbia